Alvin J. Green (born June 9, 1998) is an American football cornerback for the Cleveland Browns of the National Football League (NFL). He played college football at Oklahoma State.

High school career 
Green played cornerback at DeSoto High School. He was a three-star cornerback coming out of high school, receiving offers from several Division I schools, such as Missouri, Colorado, and Oklahoma. Green ultimately committed to Oklahoma State on August 25, 2015.

College career 
Green was named a Jim Thorpe award semifinalist after his senior season. Green participated in the 2020 Senior Bowl on January 25, 2020.

Professional career 

After going undrafted in the 2020 NFL Draft, Green signed with the Cleveland Browns as an undrafted free agent on May 5, 2020. He was waived during final roster cuts on September 5, 2020, and signed to the practice squad the next day. He was elevated to the active roster on September 26 and January 2, 2021, for the team's weeks 3 and 17 games against the Washington Football Team and Pittsburgh Steelers, and reverted to the practice squad after each game. Green was elevated to the active roster yet again on January 9, 2021, for the team's wild card playoff game against the Pittsburgh Steelers, and reverted to the practice squad again following the game. He was placed on the practice squad/injured list on January 12.

Green signed a reserve/futures contract by the Browns on January 18, 2021.

Personal life 
Alvin Green III (AJ) is the eldest and only son of Nissaa Muhammad and Alvin Green II. He has two sisters Nila Green and Nadiya Green

References 

1998 births
Living people
Players of American football from Dallas
People from DeSoto, Texas
American football defensive backs
Oklahoma State Cowboys football players
Cleveland Browns players